Paul Taylor (born 1960) is an American smooth jazz alto and soprano saxophonist who has released twelve albums since his debut On the Horn in 1995. He is a graduate of University of Nevada, Las Vegas (UNLV), where he attended with a full music scholarship. He is signed to Peak Records.  Although originally from Denver, Colorado, he is based in Las Vegas, Nevada. He has worked extensively with Keiko Matsui and played as a special guest with the Rippingtons for a short time in 1999 and 2000, after Jeff Kashiwa left the group and before Eric Marienthal joined them.

He collaborated with many R&B vocalists such as LaToya London, Regina Belle, Maxi Priest, Peabo Bryson and Terry Dexter. His reedy tone and warm, bright sound frame dynamic, danceable grooves and intricate pop shot through with electronica.

Discography

Studio albums

References

1960 births
Living people
American jazz saxophonists
American male saxophonists
Smooth jazz saxophonists
People from Denver
Musicians from Las Vegas
The Rippingtons members
21st-century American saxophonists
21st-century American male musicians
American male jazz musicians